Kristaps Dārgais (born 9 August 1990 in Ogre, Latvia) is a Latvian professional basketball player and a professional dunker. He is currently playing for BK Ogre at both forward positions.

He has been a professional dunker and part of dunker program Dunk Elite. Dargais is a five time Latvian Basketball League All Star game participant. He's a six time LBL All Star Game Slam Dunk contest winner, FIBA 3x3 Slam Dunk kontest winner in 2013 and multiple time winner of various slam dunk contests around the world. Dargais has been a multiple contestant and a winner of one of the greatest slam dunk contests in a world Kings of Air.

Dargais was named the regular season MVP of 2021–22 Latvian–Estonian Basketball League.

Honours
Latvijas Basketbola līga silver: 2020
Latvijas Basketbola līga bronze: 2017, 2019, 2021
Latvian-Estonian Basketball League bronze: 2021

References

External links
 Profile at estlatbl.com
 Profile at basket.lv

1990 births
Living people
Latvian basketball players
BK Barons players
BK Valmiera players
People from Ogre, Latvia